The 2nd constituency of Guadeloupe is a French legislative constituency in
Guadeloupe, an insular region of France located in the Leeward Islands.

Since 2022, it is represented by Christian Baptiste a Progressive Democratic Party of Guadeloupe deputy.

Deputies

Election results

2022

2017

2012

References

Sources

Official results of French elections from 2002: "Résultats électoraux officiels en France" (in French).

2